A Little Green Book of Monster Stories is a collection of short stories written by American author Joe R. Lansdale, published by Borderlands Press as part of their "Little Book" series. It was limited to five hundred copies.

It contained the following stories, and possibly one more not listed here:
"Artificial Man"
"Bar Talk" (originally published in New Blood #7, 1990)
"Bob the Dinosaur Goes to Disneyland" (originally published in Midnight Graffiti, Fall 1989)
"Chompers" (originally published in Twilight Zone Magazine, July 1982)
"The Dump" (originally published in Twilight Zone Magazine, July 1981)
"Huitzilopochtli" (originally published in The Good, The Bad, and the Indifferent, 1997)
"Night They Missed the Horror Show" (originally published in Silver Scream, ed. David J. Schow (1988))
"Personality Problem" (originally published in Twilight Zone Magazine, Jan/Feb 1983)
"The White Rabbit" (originally published in The Arbor House Necropolis, ed. Bill Pronzini (1981))

"Artificial Man" has never been published anywhere else, and "The White Rabbit" has only been collected in the now out-of-print Bestsellers Guaranteed.

References

External links
Author's Official Website

Short story collections by Joe R. Lansdale
2003 short story collections
Horror short story collections
Works by Joe R. Lansdale